Lycée Français Pierre Loti d'Istanbul is a French international school in Istanbul. It serves levels maternelle (preschool) through lycée (senior high school). It has one campus in Tarabya and one in Beyoğlu.

References

External links

 Lycée Français Pierre Loti d'Istanbul

High schools in Istanbul
International schools in Istanbul
Istanbul